Shakespeare's Macbeth – A Tragedy in Steel is a 2002 concept album by German heavy metal band Rebellion, based on the story of William Shakespeare's play Macbeth. The album has many spoken passages.

Track listing
"Introduction" – 2:31
"Disdaining Fortune" – 4:59
"The Prophecy" – 6:56
"Husbandry in Heaven" – 13:11
"The Dead Arise" – 8:29
"Evil Speaks" – 4:06
"Letters of Blood" – 4:22
"Revenge" – 6:18
"Claws of Madness" – 8:01
"Demons Rising" – 7:49
"Die with Harness on Your Back" – 6:12
"The Blood of my Brothers/Death Above Us" – 5:27
"I Can See the Judgment in Your Eyes, Pt. II" – 7:14
"Just Like a Rainbow in the Dark Pt. 2 This Time It's Metal" – 5:33
All songs written by Lulis and Göttlich, except track 3 (Eilen and Lulis).

Credits
Michael Seifert — vocals
Uwe Lulis — guitars
Björn Eilen — guitars, vocals, accordions
Tomi Göttlich — bass
Randy Black — drums
Skylar M. Prinkle — swordsman
Ben Iver — Whipstick

Speakers, cast
Narrator — Bob Lyng
Macbeth — Tomi Göttlich
Lady MacBeth, Speaker and Singer — Francesca (Schmidt) Tzamtzis
Macduff — Björn Eilen
First witch — Yvonne Thorhauer
Second witch — Saskia Schenkel
Third witch — Ana Lara
Gentlewoman — Christopher Lundmark
Doctor — Randy Black
Young Siward — Eli Hughes

2003 albums
Concept albums
Rebellion (band) albums
Works based on Macbeth
Drakkar Entertainment albums
Music based on works by William Shakespeare